Belzebuth is a 2017 Mexican horror film directed by Emilio Portes, starring Joaquín Cosío and Tobin Bell.

Synopsis
The story begins in a hospital with detective Emmanuel Ritter and his wife celebrating the birth of their baby. When Ritter receives a call from his office, he leaves and a nurse takes the baby to the nursery. The nurse locks the nursery door, takes out a scalpel, and starts to stab Ritter's baby and other infants in the nursery. Before anyone can break into the nursery, the nurse has killed all the newborns and slit her own throat.

Many years later, Ritter remains traumatized and emotionally distant, unable to process the death of his son. At work, he learns of a mass shooting at an elementary school. This turns out to be only one of a series of gruesome massacres in the area. Ritter embarks on a paranormal investigation, looking for an excommunicated priest and trying to find the evil force responsible for the shocking incidents.

Cast

Reception

References

External links
 
 

2010s English-language films
2010s Spanish-language films
Mexican horror films
2017 horror films
2017 multilingual films
Mexican multilingual films
2010s Mexican films